Tragic Carnival (Italian: Carnevale tragico) is a 1924 Italian silent film directed by Ubaldo Maria Del Colle.

Cast
 Elisa Cava 
 Alberto Danza 
 Ubaldo Maria Del Colle
 Ugo DeStefano 
 Tina Somma

References

Bibliography
 Tatti Sanguineti. L'anonimo Pittaluga: tracce, carte, miti. Transeuropa, 1998.

External links

1924 films
1920s Italian-language films
Films directed by Ubaldo Maria Del Colle
Italian silent feature films
Italian black-and-white films